In enzymology, a glucuronosyl-disulfoglucosamine glucuronidase is an enzyme that catalyzes the following chemical reaction:

3-D-glucuronosyl-N2,6-disulfo-beta-D-glucosamine + H2O  D-glucuronate + N2,6-disulfo-D-glucosamine

Thus, the two substrates of this enzyme are 3-D-glucuronosyl-N2,6-disulfo-beta-D-glucosamine and H2O, whereas its two products are D-glucuronate and N2,6-disulfo-D-glucosamine.

This enzyme belongs to the family of hydrolases, to be specific those glycosidases that hydrolyse O- and S-glycosyl compounds.  The systematic name of this enzyme class is 3-D-glucuronsyl-N2,6-disulfo-beta-D-glucosamine glucuronohydrolase. Other names in common use include glycuronidase, and 3-D-glucuronsyl-2-N,6-disulfo-beta-D-glucosamine glucuronohydrolase.

References 

 

EC 3.2.1
Enzymes of unknown structure